Barbin is a surname. Notable people with the surname include:
Bryan Barbin (born 1957), American politician
Enrico Barbin (born 1990), Italian racing cyclist
François Barbin (1691–1765), French porcelain maker
Herculine Barbin (1838–1868), French intersex person who was known for her memoir
Pedro Barbin (1895–1984), Filipino politician

French-language surnames
Italian-language surnames
Tagalog-language surnames